Dyschirius amphibolus is a species of ground beetle in the subfamily Scaritinae. It was described by J. Muller in 1922.

References

amphibolus
Beetles described in 1922